Eslamabad (also Romanized as Eslāmābād) is a village in Jam Rural District, in the Central District of Jam County, Bushehr Province, Iran. At the 2006 census, its population was 513, in 125 families.

References 

Populated places in Jam County